is a passenger railway station located in Hodogaya-ku, Yokohama, Japan, operated by the private railway operator Sagami Railway (Sotetsu).

Lines 
Hoshikawa Station is served by the Sagami Railway Main Line, and lies 3.3 kilometers from the starting point of the line at Yokohama Station.

Station layout
The station consists of two island platforms serving four tracks. The station building is elevated and is located above the platforms and tracks.

Platforms

History 
It was renamed to its present name on April 1, 1933.

Passenger statistics
In fiscal 2019, the station was used by an average of 28,302 passengers daily.

The passenger figures for previous years are as shown below.

Surrounding area
Hodogaya Ward Office (north exit)
Yokohama Business Park (south exit)

Bus services
North Exit
 bus stop (5 minutes walking)
 bus stop (5 minutes walking)

South Exit
Hoshikawa Station bus stop (in front of the station)
Sagami Railway Bus
<旭4>Mitatebashi
<旭4>Hodogaya Station West Exit (via Daimon-dōri)
Hoshikawa Station bus stop (3 minutes walking)
For the west
Yokohama Municipal Bus
<22>Hodogaya Station West Exit (via Wadamachi Station)
<25>Hodogaya Statien West Exit (via Hanamidai)
Sagami Railway Bus
<浜16>Nishihara Housing Complex (via Wadamachi Station)
For the east
Yokohama Municipal Bus
<25>Yokohama Station West Exit (via Daimon-dōri)
<22, 25>Hodogaya Station West Exit (via Daimon-dōri)
<深夜25>Hodogaya Garage mae (via Daimon-dōri)
Sagami Railway Bus
<浜16>Yokohama Station West Exit (via Daimon-dōri)

See also
 List of railway stations in Japan

References

External links 

 Official home page  

Railway stations in Kanagawa Prefecture
Railway stations in Japan opened in 1927
Railway stations in Yokohama